Cnaphalocrocis araealis is a moth in the family Crambidae. It was described by George Hampson in 1912. It is found in Australia, where it has been recorded from Queensland.

References

Moths described in 1912
Spilomelinae